Itardiornis is an extinct genus of the family Messelornithidae from late Eocene and early Oligocene. Only one species is described, Itardiornis hessae, from Quercy fissure fillings.

References

Further reading 
 Mayr, G. Paleogene Fossil Birds. Springer, 2009. p. 93

Messelornithidae
Eocene birds
Paleogene birds of Europe
Paleogene France
Fossils of France
Quercy Phosphorites Formation